Kathryn Jane Kates (January 29, 1948 – January 22, 2022) was an American actress. She was known for appearances on Seinfeld in the episodes "The Rye" and "The Dinner Party." She also appeared in Law & Order: Special Victims Unit, Orange Is the New Black, The Many Saints of Newark among other roles in television and film. Kates also has many off-Broadway credits.

Early life and career
Kathryn Jane Kates was born in New York City on January 29, 1948. Her father, Louis Kates, was an electronics engineer. Her mother, Sylvia Kates, was an actress who worked under the stage name Madelyn Cates. Kathryn Kates graduated from Great Neck North Senior High School in 1967. She graduated from Tisch School of the arts at New York University in 1971. Ms. Kates moved to Los Angeles in 1974 Where she began her acting career. She is one of 25 actors who are founding members of The Colony Theatre, at The Studio Theatre in the Silver Lake district of Los Angeles. Kates, was co-general manager with Barbara Beckley of The Colony from 1975 to 1981. Kates and Beckley produced all of the company's plays during those years. Kathryn Kates played opposite John Larroquette as his mother, lover, and wife: as his mother in Enter Laughing (Cast Theatre, 1974); as his wife in A Company of Wayward Saints (Colony Theatre 1978); and as his lover in The Lady's Not For Burning (Colony Theatre, 1979). Kates also appeared in many of The Colony Theater's L.A. Drama Critics' Circle award-winning productions such as The Grapes of Wrath and The Martian Chronicles.

Later career

One of Kates's most memorable roles was her recurring appearance on Seinfeld as The Counter Woman in the episodes "The Dinner Party" (1994) and "The Rye" (1996). Other recurring roles have been on the Disney series Lizzie McGuire as Mrs. Carrabino ("You're a Good Man, Lizzie McGuire", 2002 and "My Fair Larry", 2003), on Pam Am (2011) as Mrs. Luckovich, as June Starr in Judging Amy (2003), as Ginny in Caroline in the City, as Mrs. Bowman in Hudson Street (1996), and as Mable Maloney in a two-part Matlock, "The Witness Killings" (1991). Kates had a recurring role in the Orange Is the New Black. She was a series lead in the CBS/Showtime pilot Gurland on Gurland, playing Myrna Birnbaum. She also appeared in Reggie Rock Bythewood's pilot for the BET network, Gun Hill, as Bora.

Kates worked in film, for director Daryl Wein in Lola Versus, and for Paul Moshe Mones in Dovid Moyer as Odel, the Orthodox cook. She also worked with Don Siegel (in Jinxed!,) and Lamont Johnson in the television movie Life of The Party: The Story of Beatrice (1982). She won the Drama Logue Award for best actress for her role as Ruby in Marsha Norman's Getting Out (1982), and in 2010 received a Best Supporting Actress nomination from the MITF in NYC for her work in Gray Matters as the high-powered agent, Miriam Berger (2010). 

After relocating to New York City in 2006, Kates appeared in over twenty off- and off-off-Broadway productions, and toured Europe (Bucharest, Sibiu and Stockholm) with Saviana Stanescu's Waxing West, She was the Palestinian Aunt in the New York Theatre Workshop production of Food and Fadwa, on Theatre Row in Herman Kline's Midlife Crisis, and, more recently starred along with Greg Mullavey and Gaby Hoffmann in The Last Seder. She was a company member of Daniel Talbott's Rising Phoenix Rep.

Death
Kates died of lung cancer at her brother's home in Lake Worth, Florida on January 22, 2022, a week short of turning 74.

Filmography

References

External links
 
 Official website: www.kathrynkates.com
 Official website: www.colonytheatre.org
 Official Website: Visible Soul: People You Should Know, Kathryn Kates

1948 births
2022 deaths
Place of death missing
20th-century American actresses
21st-century American actresses
Actresses from New York City
American film actresses
American stage actresses
American television actresses
Deaths from lung cancer in Florida